The Robbery of the Third Reich is a 2004 Serbian comedy film directed by Zdravko Šotra.

Cast

External links 

2004 comedy films
2004 films
Films set in Serbia
Films set in Yugoslavia
Films set in Germany
Serbian comedy films
Films set in Belgrade
Films shot in Belgrade
2000s Serbian-language films
Films directed by Zdravko Šotra
Films about the Serbian Mafia